Île-de-France has no official flag and coat of arms other than using the logo of the Île-de-France government. The royal coat of arms of France, three gold Fleur-de-lis on a solid-blue background, used to serve as the coat of arms of the Province of Île-de-France before it was dissolved 1790 during the French Revolution.

See also
 List of flags of Île-de-France

References

Île-de-France
Flags of France